"It Would Be So Nice" is a 1968 song by the rock band Pink Floyd, written by the keyboard player/singer Richard Wright. It was the fourth single released by the group and the first to feature new guitarist David Gilmour, following the departure of founding member Syd Barrett. 

The song was left out of the 1971 collection Relics which collected other rare tracks from Pink Floyd singles. Its B-side, "Julia Dream", was written by the bass guitarist Roger Waters (who was gradually transitioning into his eventual role as the predominant songwriter and vocalist) and was also re-released on The Early Singles.

Alleged alternate version
According to a newspaper story published in April 1968, there are two versions of the original single with slightly different lyrics. The story goes that the first lyric had a passing reference to the London evening newspaper, the Evening Standard. This was said to be banned by the BBC because of a strict no-advertising policy which did not allow the mention of any product by name. The article, published in the Evening Standard, claimed that the group were forced to spend an additional £750 to record a special version for the BBC which changed the lyric to "Daily Standard". This version is the only one that has been reissued on LP and CD. It is unknown how many of the "Evening Standard" discs, if any, actually exist. Despite the added publicity, the single received very little airplay and failed to enter the UK Singles Chart.

Reception
In The Dark Side of the Moon: The Making of the Pink Floyd Masterpiece, John Harris writes about the song:

Nick Mason was even more vocal than Waters in his dislike for the song:

Personnel
Richard Wright – double-tracked lead vocals, Farfisa organ, tack piano, Mellotron, recorder
David Gilmour – electric guitar, acoustic guitar, backing vocals
Roger Waters – bass guitar
Nick Mason – drums

Other versions
A different recording of the song appears on Captain Sensible's second solo album, The Power of Love.

References

1968 singles
Pink Floyd songs
Psychedelic pop songs
Songs written by Richard Wright (musician)
Columbia Graphophone Company singles
1968 songs